Rehoboth (or Basterland) was a bantustan in South West Africa (present-day Namibia) intended by the apartheid government to be a self-governing homeland for the Baster people in the area around the town of Rehoboth, Namibia. A centrally administered local government was created in 1979. The bantustan existed until 29 July 1989, a few months prior to the Independence of Namibia.

See also 
Apartheid
Divide and rule
Leaders of Rehoboth

External links 
Rehoboth Basters, information on the history of the Baster community in Namibia.

History of Namibia
Bantustans in South West Africa
Rehoboth, Namibia
States and territories established in 1979
States and territories disestablished in 1989
Enclaves and exclaves
Coloured Namibian people